The Koch reaction is an organic reaction for the synthesis of tertiary carboxylic acids from alcohols or alkenes. The reaction is a strongly acid-catalyzed carbonylation using carbon monoxide, and typically occurs at high pressures ranging from 50 to 5,000 kPa, often requiring temperatures several hundred degrees higher than room temperature. Generally the reaction is conducted with strong mineral acids such as sulfuric acid, HF or BF3. Large scale operations for the fine chemical industry produce almost 150,000 tonnes of Koch acids and their derivatives annually but also generate a great deal of waste, motivating ongoing attempts to use metal, solid acid, and other novel catalysts to enable the use of milder reaction conditions.  Formic acid, which readily decomposes to carbon monoxide in the presence of acids or relatively low heat, is often used instead of carbon monoxide directly; this procedure was developed shortly after the Koch reaction and is more commonly referred to as the Koch–Haaf reaction. This variation allows for reactions at nearly standard room temperature and pressure. Some commonly industrially produced Koch acids include pivalic acid, 2,2-dimethylbutyric acid and 2,2-dimethylpentanoic acid.

Mechanism
	When standard acid catalysts such as sulfuric acid or a mix of BF3 and HF are used, the mechanism begins by protonation of the alkene, followed by carbon monoxide attack of the resulting carbocation. The subsequent acylium cation is then hydrolysed to the tertiary carboxylic acid. If the substrate is an alcohol, it is protonated and subsequently eliminated, generating a carbocation that is converted to an acylium cation by carbon monoxide and then hydrolysed. Tertiary carbocation formation is typically thermodynamically favored when considering hydride or alkyl shifts in the carbocation.

Catalyst usage and variations
	Industrial large scale application of the Koch reaction using strong mineral acids is complicated by equipment corrosion, separation procedures for products and difficulty in managing large amounts of waste acid. Several acid resins and acidic ionic liquids have been investigated in order to discover if Koch acids can be synthesized in more mild environments. Although the use of acidic ionic liquids for the Koch reaction requires relatively high temperatures and pressures (8 MPa and 430 K in one 2006 study), acidic ionic solutions themselves can be reused with only a very slight decrease in yield, and the reactions can be carried out biphasically to ensure easy separation of products. 
A large number of transition metal catalyst carbonyl cations have also been investigated for usage in Koch-like reactions: Cu(I), Au(I) and Pd(I) carbonyl cations catalysts dissolved in sulfuric acid can allow the reaction to progress at room temperature and atmospheric pressure. Usage of a Nickel tetracarbonyl catalyst with CO and water as a nucleophile is known as the Reppe carbonylation, and there are many variations on this type of metal-mediated carbonylation used in industry, particularly those used by Monsanto and the Cativa processes, which convert methanol to acetic acid using acid catalysts and carbon monoxide in the presence of metal catalysts.

Side reactions
Koch reactions can involve a large number of side products, although high yields are generally possible (Koch and Haaf reported yields of over 80% for several alcohols in their 1958 paper). Carbocation rearrangements, etherization (in case an alcohol is used as a substrate, instead of an alkene), and occasionally substrate CN+1 carboxylic acids are observed due to fragmentation and dimerization of carbon monoxide-derived carbenium ions, especially since each step of the reaction is reversible. Alkyl sulfuric acids are also known to be possible side products, but are usually eliminated by the excess sulfuric acid used.

Applications
Koch–Haaf-type reactions see extensive use in rational drug design as a convenient way to generate crucial tertiary carboxylic acids. Companies such as Shell and ExxonMobil produce pivalic acid from isobutene using the Koch reaction, as well as several other branched carboxylic acids. However, Koch–Haaf reactions are also utilized for the interrogation of several other topics. As the reactants are found in different phases, the Koch reaction has been used to study reaction kinetics of gas–liquid–liquid systems as well as query the use of solid acid resins and acidic ionic liquids in reducing hazardous by-product waste.

References

Addition reactions
Name reactions